Eisner & Iger was a comic book "packager" that produced comics on demand for publishers entering the new medium during the late-1930s and 1940s, period fans and historians call the Golden Age of Comic Books. Many of comic books' most significant creators, including Jack Kirby, entered the field through its doors.

The company, formally titled the Eisner and Iger Studio, was also known as Syndicated Features Corporation. Will Eisner, in a 1997 interview, referred to the company as both "Eisner & Iger" and the "Art Syndication Company". It existed from 1936 to 1939. In addition to comic books, the company also sold color comic strips, such as Adventures of the Red Mask and Pop's Night Out, to newspapers.

Origin
The origin of the company has been recounted by its namesakes, Will Eisner and Jerry Iger, in highly different ways, each given below, in alphabetical order.

Eisner & Iger was formed to service the emerging market for American comic books, which had originated in the early 1930s as tabloid-sized magazines that reprinted newspaper comic strips, adding color to black-and-white daily comics. By 1935, sporadic new material was beginning to be created for them. One such seminal comic book, Henle Publications' Wow, What a Magazine! published by John Henle and edited by Samuel Maxwell "Jerry" Iger, a former cartoonist. Wow, which folded after issue No. 4 (Nov. 1936), brought Iger together with a 19-year-old Will Eisner – the future creator of The Spirit and some of the earliest and most influential graphic novels – who wrote and drew the adventure feature "Scott Dalton", the pirate feature "The Flame", and the secret agent feature "Harry Karry" for Wow.

Will Eisner account
According to Eisner, the demise of Wow prompted him to suggest that he and the out-of-work Iger form a partnership to produce new comics, anticipating that the well of available reprints would soon run dry. He said that in late 1936, the two formed Eisner & Iger, one of the first comics packagers. Iger was 32; Eisner claimed to be 25 so as not to scare Iger off.

As Eisner recounted,

Renting a one-room office on East 41st Street in Manhattan for $5 a month (the first three months' rent fronted by Eisner, who'd just been paid for a one-time commercial art job for a product called Gre-Solvent), Eisner & Iger began, with the former as the sole writing and art staff and the latter handling sales and also lettering the comics. Through Eisner's use of pseudonyms, including "Willis Rensie" ("Eisner" spelled backward) and "Erwin" (his middle name), the company gave the impression of being larger than it was.

A fictionalized account of Eisner's time with the company is depicted in Eisner's largely autobiographical graphic novel, The Dreamer.

Jerry Iger account
In a 1985 account, Iger said:

Note: Eisner was not drafted in 1940, but in 1942. Eisner did leave the firm in 1940  to produce The Spirit.

Company history and influence
However, it was structured, the firm grew to be one of the most successful and influential of such comics packagers as Funnies, Inc. (which supplied the contents of Marvel Comics No. 1, including the Human Torch, the Sub-Mariner and the Angel) and the quirkily named Harry "A" Chesler's studio.

Its first client, made through Iger's connections at Wow! was Editors Press Service. Joshua B. Powers, reportedly a former U.S. government agent whose beat was South America, had founded the company when he retired, and provided Latin American newspapers with comics strips, cooking features and other material in exchange for ad space that he would in turn sell to U.S. companies. After expanding to other countries, Editors Press Service had a British client, the magazine Wags, for which Eisner and Iger, under the pseudonym "W. Morgan Thomas," created the leggy, leopard-wearing jungle goddess Sheena. That much-imitated "female Tarzan" would become famous stateside in 1938 when writer "William Thomas" and artist Mort Meskin took over her exploits in Eisner & Iger client Fiction House's Jumbo Comics No. 1.

Eisner & Iger created material as well for Fox Comics, Quality Comics, and others. By 1939, the firm had 15 writers, artists and letterers on staff, according to Eisner: "They were working for me full-time, on salary. I tried to avoid dealing with freelancers on a per-page basis", (although future industry veteran Jack Kirby called his early work in the Eisner & Iger office freelance). Other future luminaries who worked there included Lou Fine, Bob Kane, Bob Powell and Jules Feiffer. During this time, Eisner is credited with co-creating characters including Doll Man and Blackhawk.

Turning a profit of $1.50 a page, Eisner claimed, "I got very rich before I was 22", later detailing that in Depression-era 1939, for example, he and Iger "had split $25,000 between us", a considerable amount for the time.

After Eisner sold his share of company stock to Iger in late 1939 or early 1940 in order to leave and launch The Spirit, Iger would continue to package comics as the S. M. Iger Studio  through 1955.

Jerry Iger is not related to comic book publisher Fred Iger. He is, however, the great-uncle of The Walt Disney Company's former executive chairman and current CEO Bob Iger. Will Eisner, meanwhile, is not related to Disney's CEO Michael Eisner.

See also
 Everett M. "Busy" Arnold
 Harry "A" Chesler
 Funnies Inc.

Notes

References

External links
Jerry Iger at the Lambiek Comiclopedia
Wildwood Cemetery: The Spirit Database. WebCitation archive.

Collectors Society forum: "Short-Lived Titles of the Golden Age"
 Holloway, Clark J. "Sheena, Queen of the Jungle", The Holloway Pages (fan site), 2000. WebCitation archive.
 

Publishing companies established in 1936
Companies based in New York City
Comics studios
Golden Age comics creators
Design companies established in 1936
1936 establishments in New York City
1939 disestablishments in New York (state)
Design companies disestablished in 1939
Mass media companies disestablished in 1939